The Sacred Heart Church (German: Propsteikirche Herz Jesu) is the main Roman Catholic church in Lübeck. It was built in 1888 and consecrated on 10 May 1891.

SacredHeart
Lubeck SacredHeart
Lubeck SacredHeart
Gothic Revival church buildings in Germany